is a railway station on the Chikuhō Main Line operated by JR Kyushu in Nōgata, Fukuoka Prefecture, Japan. The station also hosts the northern terminus of the Heisei Chikuho Railway Ita Line.

Lines
In addition, the station is the northern terminus and starting point of the Heisei Chikuho Railway Ita line.

Station layout
The JR part of the station consists of two island platforms serving four tracks. Passing loops run between the platform tracks. In addition, numerous sidings branch off the main tracks. To the west of the station, there are more sidings that belong to the JR Kyushu Nōgata train depot. The Heisei Chikuho Railway part of the station comprises two bay platforms serving two tracks.

Adjacent stations

|-
|colspan=5 style="text-align:center;" |JR Kyūshū

|-
|colspan=5 style="text-align:center;" |Heisei Chikuhō Railway

History
On 11 February 1893, a new stretch of track was laid from the station to Kanada. On 1 October 1897, the Chikuho Kogyo Railway, now renamed the Chikuho Railway, merged with the Kyushu Railway. After the Kyushu Railway was nationalized on 1 July 1907, Japanese Government Railways (JGR) took over control of the station. On 12 October 1909, the track from Wakamatsu became the Chikuho Main Line while the track to Kanada became the Ita Line. With the privatization of Japanese National Railways (JNR), the successor of JGR, on 1 April 1987, control of the station passed to JR Kyushu. On 1 October 1989, Heisei Chikuho Railway assumed control of the Ita Line.

Passenger statistics
In fiscal 2016, the station was used by an average of 3,322 passengers daily (boarding passengers only), and it ranked 57th among the busiest stations of JR Kyushu.

References

External links

Nōgata Station (JR Kyushu)

Railway stations in Japan opened in 1891
Railway stations in Fukuoka Prefecture
Nōgata, Fukuoka